Fane Lozman and the city of Riviera Beach, Florida, have been parties to a number of lawsuits, two of which have been heard by the United States Supreme Court.

 In Lozman v. City of Riviera Beach, 568 U.S. 115 (2013), the Supreme Court ruled that a "vessel" is something that a reasonable observer would consider designed for transportation on water, and that Lozman's floating home was thus not a vessel.
 In Lozman v. City of Riviera Beach, 585 U.S. ___ (2018), the Supreme Court ruled that the existence of probable cause for a city police officer's arrest of Lozman did not bar him from bringing a retaliation claim under 42 U.S.C. § 1983.